Theeyampakkam, is a developing residential area in North Chennai, a metropolitan city in Tamil Nadu, India

Location

Theeyampakkam is located in North Chennai with  Andarkuppam in the east and Mathur to the South. Other neighbouring areas include Manali, Madhavaram, Kodungaiyur.

The arterial roads to Theeyampakkam are the Anna Salai (Andarkuppam-Redhills Road), Madhavaram Milk Colony Road and the Kamarajar Salai. With the Inner Ring Road becoming functional the area was easily accessible from the Chennai Mofussil Bus Terminus.

External links
Corporation of Chennai

Neighbourhoods in Chennai